The lion is a big cat of the species Panthera leo that inhabits the African continent and one forest in India.

Lion or Lions may also refer to:

Arts, entertainment, and media

Films
Lion (2014 film), a British film directed by Simon P. Edwards
Lion (2015 film), an Indian Telugu film directed by Satyadev
Lion (2016 film), an Australian film directed by Garth Davis

Music

Groups
Lion (band), 1980s American rock band
Lion, Taiwanese rock band formed in 2016 by Jam Hsiao
Lions (band), American rock band from Texas formed in 2005
The Lions (band), L.A. reggae band

Albums
Lion (Elevation Worship album), 2022
Lion (The Hot Monkey album), 1989
Lion (Stephen Lynch album), 2012
Lion (Peter Murphy album), 2014
Lion (Punchline album), 2018
Lion (Marius Neset album)
Lions (album), a 2001 album by The Black Crowes

Songs
"Lion" ((G)I-dle song), a song by (G)I-DLE from Queendom Final Comeback
"Lion" (Elevation Worship song), a song by Elevation Worship featuring Chris Brown and Brandon Lake, 2022
"Lion", a Macross Frontier song
"Lion", a song by Hollywood Undead from their album Notes from the Underground, 2013
"Lion", a song by Toto from Isolation (Toto album)
"Lions", from the 1978 Dire Straits album Dire Straits
"Lions", from the 1984 Tones on Tail album Pop
"Lions", from the 2008 The Features album Some Kind of Salvation
"Lions", from the 2009 Tune-Yards album Bird-Brains
"Lions!', from the 2009 Lights album The Listening
"Lions", from the 2011 Nothing Til Blood album When Lambs Become Lions
"Lions", from the 2012 Walk the Moon album Walk the Moon
"Lions", from the 2013 Adema album Topple the Giants
"Lions", from the 2014 William Fitzsimmons album Lions
"Lions", from the 2015 Ben Haenow album Ben Haenow
"Lions", from the 2016 Coasts album Coasts
"Lions", from the 2016 Skillet album Unleashed
"Lions", from the 2017 Chase Rice album Lambs & Lions
"Lions', by Skip Marley, 2017
"Lions", from the 2019 Jenny Hval album The Practice of Love
"Lions", from the 2018 Leon Bridges album Good Thing

Publications
Lion (comics), a weekly British comic published from 1952 to 1974
 The Lion (DeMille novel), a 2010 novel by Nelson DeMille
 The Lion (Kessel novel), a 1958 novel by Joseph Kessel
Lion (magazine), published by Lions Clubs International
Lion Comics, a Tamil comic book series

Other media
Lion (video game), a 1995 computer game 
"The Lion", the first episode of the 1965 Doctor Who serial The Crusade
Lions (Kemeys), a pair of outdoor 1894 bronze sculptures by Edward Kemeys

Brands and enterprises
Lion (Australasian company), a beverage company that operates in Australia and New Zealand
Bega Dairy & Drinks, formerly known as Lion Dairy & Drinks (when a division of the above) 
Lion (chocolate bar), a chocolate bar
Lion Air, Indonesia's largest privately run airline
 Lion brand foods, started by D. & J. Fowler Ltd. in Adelaide in the late 19th century
Lion Brand Yarns, a US manufacturer of yarn
Lion Brand Stationery, an English stationery company
Lion Brewery (disambiguation)
Lion Cereal, a breakfast cereal based on the Lion chocolate bar
Lion Corporation, a Japanese hygiene and toiletries company
Lion Ferry, a defunct Swedish ferry company
Lion Group, a Malaysian company
Lion Oil, an American company founded in 1922
Local Investing Opportunity Network
Lions Clubs International, an international charity/service organisation
The Lions (agency), Fashion model agency in New York

Places 
Lion, Belgrade, a neighborhood of Belgrade, Serbia
Gulf of Lion, south of France
Lion Park, a lion wildlife conservation enclosure in Gauteng province, South Africa
Lion Rock, a hill in Hong Kong
Lion's Mound, an artificial hill on the battlefield of Waterloo
Lion-sur-Mer, a French commune in the Calvados département
The Lion (mountain), Tasmania, Australia
The Lions (peaks), a pair of mountain peaks in British Columbia, Canada
Lion Islet (Shi Islet), Lieyu, Kinmen (Quemoy), Fujian, ROC (Taiwan)

People
Lion (name), a surname and given name (including a list of people with that name)
Lions (surname)
The Lion, a nickname or epithet; see List of people known as the Lion

Sports

American colleges
Arkansas–Fort Smith Lions, at the University of Arkansas – Fort Smith
Arkansas–Pine Bluff Golden Lions and Golden Lady Lions, at the University of Arkansas at Pine Bluff
Columbia Lions, the intercollegiate athletic program of Columbia University
Lincoln University Lions, at Lincoln University (Pennsylvania)
Lindenwood Lions, of Lindenwood University, located in St. Charles, Missouri
Loyola Marymount Lions, the intercollegiate athletic program of Loyola Marymount University
Missouri Southern Lions, at Missouri Southern State University
New Jersey Lions, at the College of New Jersey
North Alabama Lions, at the University of North Alabama
Penn State Nittany Lions, the intercollegiate athletic program of the main campus of Pennsylvania State University
Piedmont University Lions, at Piedmont University in Georgia, USA
Southeastern Louisiana Lions, the intercollegiate athletic program of Southeastern Louisiana University
Texas A&M–Commerce Lions, at Texas A&M Universitye–Commerce

Association football

Africa 
Cameroon national football team or the 
East End Lions F.C. in the Sierra Leone National Premier League
Heart of Lions F.C., a member of the Ghana Telecom Premier League
Morocco national football team, nicknamed the Atlas Lions
Nathi Lions F.C., a South African football club

Asia 
Iraq national football team, nicknamed the Lions of Mesopotamia
Lions F.C., a Philippine club
Singapore national football team or the Lions
Young Lions FC, an under-23 soccer team from Singapore

Europe 
Bulgaria national football team, also known as the Bulgarian Lions
England national football team, nicknamed The Three Lions
Livingston F.C., a Scottish football team nicknamed "The Lions"
Millwall F.C., an English football team known as the Lions
Sannat Lions F.C., a football club in Malta

Elsewhere 
Columbus Lions, a charter member of the World Indoor Football League
Queensland Lions FC, or "Lions FC", Australian soccer club formerly known as the "Brisbane Lions"

Australian rules football
Brisbane Lions, a team in the AFL
Fitzroy Football Club, a team formerly in the AFL
Huonville Lions, a club currently playing in the Southern Football League
North London Lions, a team based in London
Subiaco Football Club, a team in the WAFL
Suncoast Lions Football Club, a feeder club for the Brisbane Lions

Baseball
Saitama Seibu Lions, a Japanese baseball team
Samsung Lions, a Korean baseball team
Tianjin Lions, a Chinese baseball team
Uni-President Lions, a Taiwanese baseball team

Basketball
BC SCM Timișoara, from Romania, nicknamed Leii din Banat, meaning The Lions from Banat
Colegio Los Leones de Quilpué, from Chile
Lions de Genève, from Switzerland
London Lions (basketball), from Great Britain
PS Karlsruhe Lions, from Germany
San Beda Red Lions, from the Philippines
Traiskirchen Lions, from Austria
Zhejiang Lions, from China

Cricket
Chandigarh Lions, a team from the Indian Cricket League
Highveld Lions, a South African cricket team
Surrey Lions, English county's Twenty20 and Pro40 team

Gridiron football
BC Lions, a Canadian football team
Detroit Lions, an American football team
New Yorker Lions, an American football team from Braunschweig, Germany

Handball
Limburg Lions, a handball team in Sittard-Geleen, Netherlands

Ice hockey
Finland men's national ice hockey team or the Lions
LHC Les Lions, an ice hockey team in Lyon, France

Rugby league
England national rugby league team, also known as the Lions
Great Britain national rugby league team or the Lions
Mount Albert Lions, a rugby league club in New Zealand
Swinton Lions, a British rugby league club

Rugby union
British & Irish Lions, a rugby union team representing the British Isles in international competitions
Golden Lions Rugby Union, a South African provincial rugby union that operates the Lions (United Rugby Championship)
Lions (United Rugby Championship), a South African professional rugby union team competing in the United Rugby Championship
Rugby Lions, an English rugby union club based in the town of Rugby, England

Speedway
Leicester Lions, a British speedway team
Oxford Lions, a British Speedway team based in Oxford, England

Technology
LION (cipher), an encryption algorithm
LION (cable system), a submarine telecommunications cable linking Madagascar, Réunion, and Mauritius
Lithium-ion battery, a type of rechargeable battery
OS X Lion, a version of Apple's operating system for Macintosh computers
OS X Mountain Lion, a version of Apple's operating system for Macintosh computers, proceeding OS X Lion

Transport

Vehicles
Lion (automobile), built in Adrian, Michigan, United States, from 1909 to 1912
British Rail D0260, a prototype diesel locomotive
Leyland Lion PSR1, a single-deck bus manufactured between 1960 and 1967
LMR 57 Lion, an 1838 early British steam locomotive
South Devon Railway Eagle class, a South Devon Railway 4-4-0ST steam locomotive
Stourbridge Lion, an early US steam locomotive built in Britain
The Lion (locomotive), an 1840 steam locomotive on the NRHP in the USA

Vessels
 , the name of five warships of the Royal Scottish Navy during the 16th century
Lion, a ship of the Third Supply fleet to Virginia colony in 1609
 , a 1929 Guépard-class destroyer
 , a French Navy ship of the line
 , two ships (or possibly one ship) employed by the Royal Navy
 , any of numerous British Royal Navy ships
 Lion-class destroyer, a cancelled destroyer class of the French Navy
 , also known as MS Lion, a ferry

Other uses
Lion (Boy Scouts of America), an achievement level
Lion (coin), a 15th-century Scottish coin
Lion (color)
Lion (heraldry), a common charge
Lion of Judah, a recurring theme in Judeo-Christian tradition and in Ethiopia
Napier Lion, an aircraft engine whose first prototypes were built in 1917
Leo the Lion (MGM), a mascot of Metro-Goldwyn-Mayer and some of its affiliates
Leo (constellation), one of the constellations of the zodiac, known as 'the lion'
Leo (astrology), astrological sign of the zodiac, known as 'the lion'

See also
L10n (disambiguation)
Leon (disambiguation)
Lioness (disambiguation)
Lyon (disambiguation)
Lyons (disambiguation)
Mountain lion (disambiguation)
Sea lion (disambiguation)
Löwe (disambiguation), German for lion
Assad (disambiguation), Arabic for lion
Shir (disambiguation), Persian for lion